Chalarus basalis is a species of fly in the family Pipunculidae.

Distribution
This species is common in Europe.

References

Pipunculidae
Insects described in 1873
Diptera of Europe
Taxa named by Hermann Loew